The City Mayor of Bacolod (()) is the local chief executive and head of the City Government of Bacolod. Along with the Governor of Negros Occidental and the Governor of Negros Oriental, as mayor of a highly urbanized city, he sits as one of the chief executives of Negros Island.

History
While Bacolod was first established as a town on January 20, 1755, the capital of Negros Island in 1846 and the capital of Negros Occidental in 1890, the archives of the City Government of Bacolod lists Bernardino de los Santos as Gobernadorcillo upon the establishment of Bacolod as the capital of Negros Occidental after the division of the island, while Gregorio Gonzaga as the recorded Presidente Municipal in 1894. Bacolod, being a pueblo and municipality then, was composed of a municipal council headed by a president. The Presidente Municipal may opt to be assisted by deputies normally called Tiniente Mayor.

As the Province of Negros Occidental grew in importance due to the sugar industry, Bacolod became a hub for business and politics, drawing more immigrant families into the city. Along with nearby Silay, population swelled due to economic and work opportunities, including education and the Sugar Exchange Center located near the town plaza.

Cityhood
Through Commonwealth Act No. 326, sponsored by Representative Pedro C. Hernaez of the Second District of Negros Occidental, Bacolod was chartered as a city on June 18, 1938. Alfredo Montelíbano, Sr. became the first city mayor upon his inauguration on October 18, 1938, along with the formal inauguration of the City Government of Bacolod. On the City Plaza still stands the tindalo tree planted by President Manuel Quezon as a reminder of the inauguration ceremonies.

As Highly-Urbanized City
Batas Pambansa Blg. 51 elevated the status of the city further as a highly urbanized city on December 22, 1979. Due to this, the Provincial Government of Negros Occidental ceased to have control over Bacolod. It received funding directly from the national allocation, but meant that the citizens of Bacolod cannot vote for the officials of the Provincial Government nor run for elective provincial posts.

The last city official to have become won a post in the province was former Governor Alfredo Montelibano, Jr. After the promulgation of the 1987 Philippine Constitution, Bacolod City was given its own representation in Congress as the Lone District of Bacolod.

List

References

Mayors of Bacolod
Lists of mayors of places in the Philippines